Anant Namjoshi was a politician in Maharashtra state in India, in 1960s and 1970s.

He started his career with Congress Party, and was elected from Girgaon to the state assembly in 1962 and 1967. In 1972, he entered Vidhan Sabha from Khetwadi seat. He was education minister in Vasantrao Naik's government in 1970s.

In 1978, he joined Janata Party with his fellow MLA Mohanlal Popat. But he did not take any further part in electoral politics.

References 

Possibly living people
Marathi politicians
Indian politicians
Indian National Congress politicians from Maharashtra